The Men's 100 metre breaststroke competition at the 2019 World Championships was held on 21 and 22 July 2019. Adam Peaty broke the world record with a time of 56.88 in the semi-final, the first man to swim under 57 seconds in this event, and went on to win in the final.

Records
Prior to the competition, the existing world and championship records were as follows.

The following new records were set during this competition.

Results

Heats
The heats were held on 21 July at 11:54.

Semifinals
The semifinals were held on 21 July at 20:51.

Semifinal 1

Semifinal 2

Final
The final was held on 22 July at 20:02.

References

Men's 100 metre breaststroke